Kudus (Javanese: ꦏꦸꦢꦸꦱ꧀) is the capital and the namesake of the Kudus Regency in Central Java, Indonesia. Its name has an Arabic etymology (Arab: القدس al-Quds) connected to its foundation by the legendary figure Sunan Kudus. It also houses the mosque established by Sunan Kudus named Menara Kudus Mosque, one of the most important and influential mosques in Indonesia. According to the 2010 census, its population was 92,776. 

During the Dutch East Indies era, Kudus was the seat of the Kudus Regency which was a part of Semarang Residency dating back to 1817. During the period of 1928 to 1931, it was the seat of the short-lived Koedoes Residency, which incorporated the regency as well as the neighboring Demak and Jepara regencies.

Climate
Kudus has a tropical monsoon climate (Am) with moderate to little rainfall from May to October and heavy to very heavy rainfall from November to April.

References 

Populated places in Central Java
Regency seats of Central Java